Liberty & Bash is a 1989 Action film starring Miles O'Keeffe and Lou Ferrigno as Vietnam war buddies who team up to rid their community of drugs.

Plot
Miles O'Keeffe and Lou Ferrigno star as Vietnam war buddies Liberty and Bash, who team up to rid their community of drugs. When Jesse (Richard Eden) is murdered, Liberty hunts them down with Bash to get them back for killing Jesse. Their friendship began in a time of war, when Liberty and Bash stood united against one enemy in Central America. Now, once again, the battle lines have been drawn and another war rages. It's up to them to save their oldest friend's life.

External links

1989 films
1980s English-language films